The Dockum is a Late Triassic (approximately late Carnian through Rhaetian, or 223–200 Ma) geologic group found primarily on the Llano Estacado of western Texas and eastern New Mexico with minor exposures in southwestern Kansas, eastern Colorado, and Oklahoma panhandle. The Dockum reaches a maximum thickness of slightly over 650 m but is usually much thinner. The Dockum rests on an unconformity over the Anisian (242–234 Ma) aged Anton Chico Formation. 

The Dockum and Chinle Formation were deposited roughly at the same time and share many of the same vertebrates and plant fossils. They appear to have very similar paleoenviroments. The two units are approximately separated by the Rio Grande in central New Mexico. This has led to controversy over the stratigraphic nomenclature for the Chinle and Dockum.

History of investigation
There is no designated type locality for this formation. The Dockum was named by William Fletcher Cummins for a good exposure in vicinity of town of Dockum in Dickens County, Texas, in 1890. Lucas included the Dockum Group within the Chinle when he raised the Chinle to group status, but this has not been widely accepted. Dockum was named before the Chinle, and if Lucas is correct, his "Chinle Group" should be named the Dockum Group due to stratigraphic nomenclature rules.

Stratigraphy
Lehman (1994) advocated a simplified stratigraphy of up to five geologic formations. The basal unit is the Santa Rosa Sandstone, a braided stream channel-related facies. The Santa Rosa is overlain by the Tecovas Formation (and its New Mexican equivalent, the Garita Creek Formation), which is dominated by overbank (distal floodplain) deposits with lenses of channel-deposits. Minor lacustrine deposits also occur. The Trujillo Sandstone, channel-deposits, and Cooper Canyon Formation (also known as the Bull Canyon Formation), overbank deposits with minor channel and lacustrine deposits, are separated from the Santa Rosa-Tecovas by an unconformity.  In eastern New Mexico, the Redonda Formation overlies the Cooper Canyon Formation. The Redonda has gradational eastward transition into the upper Cooper Canyon Formation.

The Santa Rosa-Tecovas sequence has sediments made up of clasts derived from the north, northeast, and east of the Dockum, very similar to clasts found in the lower Chinle. However, the Trujillo-Cooper Canyon sequence's sediments are derived from the Ouachita orogenic belts of the Marathon Uplift.

The Dockum Group in extreme northeastern New Mexico is divided four formations. These are, in ascending stratigraphic order, the Baldy Hill Formation, a mudstone with coarse-grained sandstone lenses; the Travesser Formation, a reddish-brown siltstone and sandstone with some conglomerate lenses; the Sloan Canyon Formation, a red to pale green mudstone with sandstone lenses; and the Sheep Pen Sandstone, a light brown, thinly bedded sandstone. This region is structurally separated from the Dockum Group exposures to the south by the Sierra Grande arch.

Dockum and Chinle correlation 
Correlations and ages based on Spencer G. Lucas' Land Vertebrate Faunachrons. The faunachrons are based on first and last appearances of phytosaurs. Simplified Chinle stratigraphy based on Litwin.

See also
List of dinosaur-bearing rock formations
Chinle Formation
Triassic land vertebrate faunachrons

References

External links
GEOLEX database entry for Dockum, USGS
GEOLEX database bibliographic references for Dockum

Geologic groups of Texas
Geologic groups of New Mexico
Triassic System of North America
Upper Triassic Series